Eisonyx is a genus of flower weevils in the beetle family Curculionidae. There are three described species in Eisonyx.

Species
 Eisonyx crassipes LeConte, 1880
 Eisonyx opacus (Casey, 1893)
 Eisonyx picipes Pierce, 1916

References

Baridinae
Articles created by Qbugbot